The men's 1000 meter at the Dutch Single Distance Championships 2017 took place in Heerenveen at the Thialf ice skating rink on Friday 30 December 2016. There were 22 participants.

Statistics

Result

Source:

Referee: Dina Melis Starter: André de Vries 
Start: 19:12 hr. Finish: 19:38 hr.

Draw

References

Single Distance Championships
2017 Single Distance